A Writing Fellow or Fellow in Writing is a tutor or consultant who assists with college and university writing instruction in specific courses or academic fields. Whereas most Writing Center tutors are generalists, ready to work with writing from any course or field, Writing Fellows are specialists. Often working within a Writing Center or Writing Across a Curriculum program, they typically provide oral and/or written feedback on papers to students in an upper-division writing class. A Writing Fellow is most often a peer tutor; however, the term "Writing Fellow" is also sometimes used for faculty members who advise others on teaching, assigning and responding to student writing in their specific disciplines.

See also 
Composition studies
Writing Center

External links 
 Barnard College Writing Fellows Program
 Brown University Writing Fellows
 MIT's Department of Biological Engineering, Writing Fellow Program
 Special issue of Across the Disciplines on Rewriting Across the Curriculum: Writing Fellows as Agents of Change in WAC
 The City College Writing Fellows Program
 University College Falmouth Writing Fellows
 University of Rochester Writing Fellows Program
 University of Wisconsin-Madison Undergraduate Writing Fellows Program
 Writing Across the Curriculum Clearinghouse--List of Writing Fellows Programs

Academic terminology
Education and training occupations